The Naval Academy Foreign Affairs Conference (NAFAC) is an undergraduate foreign-affairs conference in the United States. NAFAC seeks to explore current, demanding issues from both a civilian and military perspective and thus to provide a forum for addressing pressing international concerns. Held at the United States Naval Academy in Annapolis, Maryland since 1961, NAFAC brings together Naval Academy students and their civilian and military counterparts from around the world to share ideas and concerns relating to international affairs. Past speakers include: George H. W. Bush, Joseph Biden, Stephen Hadley, Madeleine Albright, Condoleezza Rice,  Robert Gates, Wesley Clark, Charles Krauthammer, Sheryl Sandberg and Hillary Clinton. The 2022 NAFAC Conference will take place April 11–14 at the United States Naval Academy. The theme will be announced shortly.

Structure
Each year a unique theme is chosen for NAFAC; noteworthy individuals with expertise in relevant fields are invited to address the conference delegates who represent colleges and universities from across the United States and around the globe. Conference attendees bring with them unique attitudes and approaches that, through discussion and interaction, are intended to enlighten the thinking of their peers.

The entire conference is organized and run by United States Naval Academy Midshipmen. These future officers of the Navy and the Marine Corps also serve as moderators, presenters, and as a minority percentage of delegates.

Harvard University and the United States Senior Military Colleges are examples of schools with annual partnerships to sponsor delegates to NAFAC.

NAFAC is proud to have a reciprocal exchange partnership with the MSC Student Conference on National Affairs at Texas A&M University, which was founded in 1955. A Naval Academy Professor, United States Army Colonel Rocco Paone, served as a facilitator in 1962 for MSC SCONA 8 immediately after founding NAFAC and thereby a partnership lasting into the present day.

NAFAC topics

 1961 - Founding year
 1996 - A New Multilaterlism
 1997 - The Struggle for Democracy
 1998 - Asia Rising?
 1999 - Keeping Peace
 2000 - Civil-Military Relations
 2001 - Terrorism
 2002 - Central and Southwest Asia
 2003 - Strangers in a Common Land: Preserving Israel and Palestine
 2004 - Post-War Reconstruction: Iraq
 2005 - Power and Purpose: Defining America's Role in the World
 2006 - Africa: Turning Attention into Action
 2007 - Asia At The Crossroads
 2008 - Latin America
 2009 - Bridging the Gap: Combatting Global Poverty
 2010 - National Security Beyond the Horizon: Changing Threats in a Changing World
 2011 - People, Power, and Politics in the Internet Age
 2012 - The Eclipse of the West?
 2013 - Time of Transition
 2014 - Human Security in the Information Age
 2015 - Sustainability and Sovereignty: Global Security in a Resource-Strained World
 2016 - Women and Security: The Implications of Promoting Global Gender Equality
 2017- A New Era of Great Power Competition?
 2018 - Guarding Liberty in a World of Democratic Undoing
 2019 - Coming Apart: The Fate of the Rules-based Order
 2020 - War, Peace, and the Gray Zone
 2021 - Global Resilience after the Pandemic
 2022 - Partnership in the 21st Century
 2023 - Upcoming

References

External links
 usna.edu/NAFAC/ Official Website
 https://www.facebook.com/USNAFAC/ Facebook Social Media Page

Naval Academy Foreign Affairs Conference (NAFAC)
United States Naval Academy
1961 establishments in Maryland
Recurring events established in 1961
Student conferences on national affairs